Olympia is an extinct town in Lowndes County, in the U.S. state of Georgia.

History
A post office called Olympia was established in 1898, and remained in operation until 1916. The community derives its name from Mount Olympus, in Greece.

References

Geography of Lowndes County, Georgia
Ghost towns in Georgia (U.S. state)